Endomychinae is a subfamily of handsome fungus beetles in the family Endomychidae. There are at least 4 genera and about 19 described species in Endomychinae.

Genera
 Danae Reiche, 1847
 Endomychus Panzer, 1795
 Saula Gerstaecker, 1858
 Stenotarsus Perty, 1832

References

Further reading

 
 
 

Endomychidae